Ernest Stewart Roberts (11 April 1847 – 16 June 1912) was born in Swineshead, Lincolnshire; a classicist and academic administrator. He served as Master of Gonville and Caius College, Cambridge and Vice-Chancellor of the University of Cambridge (1906-1908). He was admitted to Caius in 1865, elected Fellow in 1870 then Senior Tutor. He was elected President in 1894 and Master in 1903. He was involved in the foundation of the College magazine, The Caian and the College Mission at Battersea and in the organisation of the College rifle corps and boat club.

He was also ordained deacon in 1877 and priest in 1879; Roberts was a college lecturer in classics, a Cambridge University lecturer in comparative philology and one of the significant influences on the study of epigraphy.

He is described in a memoir as being uninterested in "passing political problems... The clash of parties was distasteful to his temperament... He became more conservative and more reserved about political subjects as he grew older, and some of his earlier opinions were changed".

He died in Cambridge and was buried at the Parish of the Ascension Burial Ground in Cambridge.

Publications
The following books were written or edited by Ernest Stewart Roberts.

Author
E.S. Roberts and Ernest Arthur Gardner, 1887. An Introduction to Greek Epigraphy, Vol. 1: The archaic inscriptions and the Greek alphabet. Cambridge University Press
E.S. Roberts and Ernest Arthur Gardner, 1905. An Introduction to Greek Epigraphy, Vol. 2: The inscriptions of Attica. Cambridge University Press

Editor
John Caius, The Sweating Sickness A boke or counseill against the disease commonly called the sweate or sweatyng sicknesse
John Caius, De Pronunciatione Graecae & Latinae Linguae (in Latin)
John Caius, De Rariorum Animalium atque Stirpium Historia (in Latin)

References

1847 births
1912 deaths
Alumni of Gonville and Caius College, Cambridge
English classical scholars
Fellows of Gonville and Caius College, Cambridge
Masters of Gonville and Caius College, Cambridge
People educated at Boston Grammar School
19th-century English Anglican priests
Vice-Chancellors of the University of Cambridge
People from Swineshead, Lincolnshire